Peteranec is a municipality in the Koprivnica-Križevci County in Croatia, population 2704 (2011 census).

As of 2011, there were three census-registered settlements in the municipality:
Komatnica (pop. 61)
Peteranec (pop. 1431)
Sigetec (pop. 1212)

History
Eneolithic artefacts dated to 3500–3200 BC have been found in the locality of Seče, south of Peteranec, and termed the Seče culture.

In the late 19th and early 20th century, Peteranec was part of the Bjelovar-Križevci County of the Kingdom of Croatia-Slavonia.

References

Municipalities of Croatia
Populated places in Koprivnica-Križevci County